Layered or stratified charge storage is hot water storage tank, typically for solar thermal energy. The warmest storage layer is the top storage cylinder and below this there are colder storage layers through natural layering. The water is fed into different storage levels, depending on the available feed temperature and current temperature layering. The feed takes place via a vertical line via valves, in each case the feed water is fed into the storage layer with the corresponding water temperature. This is achieved by means of self-acting valves, feeding the respective temperature or water density into the temperature layer. The advantage is that there is no mixing of the storage temperature. Swirling of the water is therefore to be avoided as far as possible in stratified storage tanks because this could lead to intermingling of storage layers. This is reduced by means of measures such as limiting flow velocity and baffle plates at the inlets.

Heating is therefore only necessary later, since warm water can be taken from above for longer, as opposed to mixed storage. In addition, water can be drawn with almost the same temperature very quickly after filling with hot water, since not all of the storage tank has to be heated. This optimises energy efficiency.

At the moment, they are generally more expensive than combined storage tank, but the storage volume can be a bit smaller and they are considered more modern because of better energy consumption.

In addition to storage for, for example, single-family houses with a few hundred to over one thousand litres, they can also be found in larger and significantly larger forms, for example, as long-term thermal storage tanks with a few thousand litres of storage volume.

Areas of application
 For solar thermal systems, to bridge periods of no sun
 For wood heating, since wood heating is otherwise difficult to control
 If a heat pump is installed in order to maintain blocking and standstill times
 For combined heat and power plants, to use them more efficiently
 For connecting different heating systems

Further reading 
 M. K. Sharp, R. I. Loehrke: Stratified Thermal Storage in Residential Solar Energy Applications In: Journal of Energy, Vol. 3, No. 2 (1979), pp 106-113
 Chapter 4.1.2. Stratification in water storage devices. In: W. Weiss (editor): Solar Heating Systems for Houses: Design Handbook for Solar Combisystems, Routledge, p. 39-41
 thermal stratification in: Goran Mijic: Solar Energy and Technology, Volume 2, De Gruyter, 2018, p. 872-873

References

Energy storage
Residential heating appliances
Heating